The Ruwenzori horseshoe bat (Rhinolophus ruwenzorii) is a species of bat in the family Rhinolophidae. It is found in Democratic Republic of the Congo, Rwanda, and Uganda. Its natural habitats are subtropical or tropical moist lowland forest and swamps, caves and other subterranean habitats.

References

Rhinolophidae
Mammals described in 1942
Taxonomy articles created by Polbot
Bats of Africa